Eagle City is an unincorporated community in Clark County, in the U.S. state of Ohio.

History
A post office called Eagle City was established in 1879, and remained in operation until 1901. Besides the post office, Eagle City had a mill, and the place was originally called Baker Mills before the post office was established.

References

Unincorporated communities in Clark County, Ohio
1879 establishments in Ohio
Populated places established in 1879
Unincorporated communities in Ohio